Souakria is a village in the Blida Province in Mitidja, Algeria.

Location
The village is surrounded by El Harrach River and also the town of Blida.

Notable people 
 Yahia Boushaki (Shahid) (1935-1960), Algerian leader and martyr.

External links

References

Villages in Algeria
Blida Province
Mitidja